Karen McKevitt is an Irish Social Democratic and Labour Party (SDLP) politician who served as a Member of the Northern Ireland Assembly (MLA) for    South Down from 2011 to 2016. She stood in the Newry and Armagh constituency in the 2016 Assembly election, getting 3,923 first preference votes, but failed to win a seat.

McKevitt entered politics in 2005 when she was elected to Newry and Mourne council, topping the poll in the Crotlieve electoral area.

McKevitt was elected to the Crotlieve DEA on Newry, Mourne and Down District Council at the 2019 local government election.

She was selected to run for the SDLP in the 2022 Northern Ireland Assembly election in her former constituency of South Down alongside Colin McGrath, but was not elected.

References

External links

1971 births
Living people
Female members of the Northern Ireland Assembly
Social Democratic and Labour Party MLAs
Northern Ireland MLAs 2011–2016
Members of Newry and Mourne District Council
Women councillors in Northern Ireland